Find the Beat is the debut studio album by American rapper Blueface. It was released on March 13, 2020, by Cash Money Records and Republic Records. The album features guest appearances by Gunna, Lil Baby, Polo G, DaBaby, Ambjaay, NLE Choppa, Stunna 4 Vegas, Jeremih, and YBN Nahmir. It was originally scheduled to be released on December 6, 2019, but was delayed due to trademark issues. A second release date, January 17, 2020, was confirmed but the album did not release due to unknown reasons. A third release date was then announced for March 13, 2020.

Release and promotion
Blueface shared the album's title and track listing on October 11, 2019. The same day, he released the album's lead single, "Close Up" featuring Jeremih.

The album's second single, "First Class" featuring Gunna, was released on October 18, 2019.

Music videos for "Close Up" and "First Class" were released on October 23 and 25, respectively.

A new non-album single, "Finesse the Beat", was released on YouTube and SoundCloud on December 22, 2019.

On November 7, 2019, he announced on his Instagram account that the album would be released on December 6. It, however, did not release then due to clearance issues.

On January 4, 2020, he announced a second release date of January 17, but the album was delayed further for unknown reasons.

On February 7, 2020, the album's third single, "Obama" featuring DaBaby was released.

On March 1, 2020, Blueface went on Instagram, posting a blurry picture of himself saying the album would be released on March 13, and claimed that "joke's over". The next day, he posted a short clip of the music video for the single "Holy Moly" featuring NLE Choppa, set for release four days later. He earlier posted a previous clip on Instagram on February 27 asking if he should drop it. The song was released on March 6, 2020, with an accompanying music video.

On March 13, 2020, the full album was released with slight changes. The track listing was slightly changed and new tracks were added, as well as some were removed. There was also an extra feature from American rapper Polo G.

Track listing

Charts

See also
List of 2020 albums

References

2020 debut albums
Blueface albums
Cash Money Records albums
Republic Records albums

G-funk albums